Giovanni Battista Bussi (Viterbo, 23 January 1755 – Benevento, 31 January 1844) was an Italian cleric. He was raised to cardinal by pope Leo XII in the consistory of 3 May 1824.

References

External links
http://www.catholic-hierarchy.org/bishop/bbussi.html 

1755 births
1844 deaths
19th-century Italian cardinals
People from Viterbo